Roland Njume Ntoko (born November 30, 1972) is a Cameroonian former professional footballer who played as a forward.

He was a Cameroon national football team player and participated in the 1996 African Cup of Nations.

He spent most of his career in Slovenia and Germany.

References

Living people
1972 births
Association football forwards
Cameroonian footballers
Cameroon international footballers
1996 African Cup of Nations players
Slovenian PrvaLiga players
NK Krka players
NK Celje players
NK Olimpija Ljubljana (1945–2005) players
SV Darmstadt 98 players
SpVgg Greuther Fürth players
Cameroonian expatriate footballers
Cameroonian expatriate sportspeople in Germany
Expatriate footballers in Germany
Cameroonian expatriate sportspeople in Slovenia
Expatriate footballers in Slovenia